Victoria (F82) is the second of the six Spanish-built s, based on the American  design, of the Spanish Navy.

Construction and career 
Laid down on 16 August 1983, and launched on 23 July 1986, Victoria was commissioned in service on 11 November 1987.

All of these Spanish frigates have the length of the later Oliver Hazard Perry frigates, and have a wider beam than the US Navy design, and therefore able to carry more top weight. Fin stabilizers are fitted.

On 29 March 2009, as she was taking part in Operation Atalanta, the German Navy tanker  was attacked by a 7-man pirate boat. In addition to the regular 40-man civilian crew, Spessart carried a 12-man security detail which exchanged small arms fire with the pirates, and repelled the assault. The SH-60 helicopter aboard Victoria intercepted the fleeing pirate skiff, opened fire, and kept guard over the surrendering pirates until relieved by naval units.

On 2 June 2010, Victoria provided medical assistance to the crew of the Libyan vessel MV Rim, and prevented recapture of that ship by Somali pirates, after the crew of MV Rim overpowered the pirates who had hijacked the ship four months earlier. MV Rim had been anchored in the harbor of Garacad, Somalia, since her 3 February 2010 taking in the Gulf of Aden. On 3 August 2010, a helicopter from Victoria stopped a pirate attack on the Norwegian chemical tanker MV Bow Saga, which had sent a distress call that it was under attack by a pirate skiff.  The seven pirates on board the skiff were later captured by a second team from the European Union naval force in the region.

On 3 August 2010, the Norwegian chemical tanker MV Bow Saga was proceeding through the transit corridor in the middle of the Gulf of Aden when it came under attack. A pirate skiff with 7 people on board shot at the bridge, damaging the windows. EU NAVFOR heard her distress call and ordered the closest warship, the Spanish frigate  Victoria react to the incident. Victoria already had her helicopter in the air and was able to intervene only ten minutes after the call. The pirates stopped the attack and tried to flee. After warning shots, first from the helicopter and then from the warship Victoria, the pirates eventually stopped. The skiff was searched by a boarding team from Victoria and weapons were subsequently found.

Gallery

Other units of class

References

External links
Video of fleeing pirate skiff from Spessart incident under helicopter fire

Ships of the Spanish Navy
1986 ships
Santa María-class frigates